Nikolai Nikolaevich Dobrynin is a Soviet and Russian stage and cinema actor, Meritorious Artist (2002).

Biography
Nikolai Dobrynin was born in the city of Taganrog on August 17, 1963. In 1985 graduated from the GITIS. In 1985–1989 worked at Satyricon Theatre in Moscow under direction of Arkady Raikin. Since 1989 Nikolai Dobrynin has worked at the studio of Alla Sigalova and at Roman Viktyuk's theater.

His first film role was in the movie Nuzhnye lyudi (Necessary People) in 1986.

Selected filmography
 1986 —  Necessary People as builder Kolya
 1987 —  Farewell, Moscow Gang as Gavrosh
 1993 —  Russian Ragtime as Misha Raevsky
 1997 —  Everything is What We Dreamed of for So Long as Nikolai
 2000 —  The Black Room as Philipp
 2010 —  Liquidation as bandit
 2010 —  Gromozeka as Eduard Kaminsky, the surgeon
 2013–2015 —  The Junior Team as Nikolai Semenovich
 2013 —  Pyotr Leschenko. Everything That Was... as Konstantin
 2014 —  House with Lilies as Dementy Shulgin, 1st secretary of the Party Committee
 2014 — Prisoner of the Caucasus! as Balbes
 2015 — Rodina as General Maksimov
 2015 — Orlova and Alexandrov as Leonid Utesov
 2015 — The Alchemist. Elixir Faust as Grigory Rasputin
 2018 — Tankers as Basich, a legless surgeon
 2009–2021 — Svaty as Dmitri Bukhankin

References

External links
 
 Nikolai Dobrynin at RusKino

1963 births
Living people
Soviet male film actors
Russian male film actors
Russian male stage actors
Russian male television actors
Actors from Taganrog
20th-century Russian male actors
21st-century Russian male actors
Russian Academy of Theatre Arts alumni
Honored Artists of the Russian Federation
Russian male voice actors